Cyclosorus is a genus of ferns in the family Thelypteridaceae, subfamily Thelypteridoideae, in the Pteridophyte Phylogeny Group classification of 2016 (PPG I). Other sources sink Cyclosorus into a very broadly defined genus Thelypteris, or expand the genus to include other genera which PPG I keeps separate. Thus the online Flora of China suggests there are about 250 species compared to the two species suggested in PPG I.

There are also fossil species known from the Eocene of South China and the Quaternary of Australia.

The genus is named from the Greek, referring to the circular sori.

Species
, the Checklist of Ferns and Lycophytes of the World accepted the following extant species, although noting that only two to four probably belonged in the genus sensu stricto, the rest needing in future to be distributed among other genera.
Cyclosorus angustipinnatus C.Chr. & Tardieu ex Tardieu
Cyclosorus attenuatus Ching ex K.H.Shing
Cyclosorus cuneatus Ching ex K.H.Shing
Cyclosorus exindusiatus (W.H.Wagner) W.H.Wagner
Cyclosorus interruptus (Willd.) H.Itô
Cyclosorus jinghongensis Ching ex K.H.Shing
Cyclosorus lenormandii (C.Chr.) Ching
Cyclosorus molundensis (Brause) Pic. Serm.
Cyclosorus nanxiensis Ching ex K.H.Shing
Cyclosorus parvifolius Ching
Cyclosorus pygmaeus Ching & C.F.Zhang
Cyclosorus shimenensis K.H.Shing & C.M.Zhang
Cyclosorus striatus (Schum.) Ching
Cyclosorus subacutus Ching
Cyclosorus thailandicus S.Linds.
Cyclosorus tottus (Thunb.) Pic. Serm.
Cyclosorus wulingshanensis C.M.Zhang

References

External links 
 
 
 Cyclosorus at Tropicos

Thelypteridaceae
Ferns of Asia
Ferns of Australasia
Fern genera